An anomalous cancellation or accidental cancellation is a particular kind of arithmetic procedural error that gives a numerically correct answer. An attempt is made to reduce a fraction by cancelling individual digits in the numerator and denominator. This is not a legitimate operation, and does not in general give a correct answer, but in some rare cases the result is numerically the same as if a correct procedure had been applied. The trivial cases of cancelling trailing zeros or where all of the digits are equal are ignored.

Examples of anomalous cancellations which still produce the correct result include (these and their inverses are all the cases in base 10 with the fraction different from 1 and with two digits):

The article by Boas analyzes two-digit cases in bases other than base 10, e.g.,  32/13 = 2/1  and its inverse are the only solutions in base 4 with two digits.

The anomalous cancellation happens also with more digits, e.g. 165/462 = 15/42 and those with different numbers of digits (98/392 = 8/32).

Elementary properties

When the base is prime, no two-digit solutions exist.  This can be proven by contradiction: suppose a solution exists.  Without loss of generality, we can say that this solution is

where the double vertical line indicates digit concatenation.  Thus, we have

But , as they are digits in base ; yet  divides , which means that .  Therefore. the right hand side is zero, which means the left hand side must also be zero, i.e., a contradiction by the definition of the problem.  (If , the calculation becomes , which is one of the excluded trivial cases.)

Another property is that the numbers of solutions in a base  is odd if and only if  is an even square.  This can be proven similarly to the above: suppose that we have a solution

Then, doing the same manipulation, we get

Suppose that . Then note that  is also a solution to the equation. This almost sets up an involution from the set of solutions to itself. But we can also substitute in to get , which only has solutions when  is a square. Let . Taking square roots and rearranging yields . Noting that , this has precisely the solutions : i.e., it has an odd number of solutions when  is an even square. The converse of the statement may be proven by noting that these solutions all satisfy the initial requirements.

See also

 Howler (mathematics)
 Mathematical joke

References

Arithmetic